Oliver Kuusik (born 21 July 1980 in Tallinn) is an Estonian opera singer (tenor)   

In 2006 he graduated from Guildhall School of Music and Drama's Opera Studio.

Since 2008 he is a tenor soloist at the Estonian National Opera.

He is a member of Association of Estonian Professional Musicians.

Roles

 Ferrando (Mozart's "Così fan tutte")
 Nicias (Massenet's "Thaïs")

References

Living people
1980 births
21st-century Estonian male opera singers
Alumni of the Guildhall School of Music and Drama
Musicians from Tallinn